Ahmed Hamada Jassim (born 18 September 1961) is a Bahraini former hurdler who competed in the 1984 Summer Olympics and in the 1988 Summer Olympics. He was the 400 metres hurdles champion at the 1986 Asian Games and won hurdles bronze medals at the 1982 Asian Games and 1983 Asian Athletics Championships.

References

1961 births
Living people
Bahraini male hurdlers
Olympic athletes of Bahrain
Athletes (track and field) at the 1984 Summer Olympics
Athletes (track and field) at the 1988 Summer Olympics
Asian Games medalists in athletics (track and field)
Athletes (track and field) at the 1982 Asian Games
Athletes (track and field) at the 1986 Asian Games
Asian Games gold medalists for Bahrain
Asian Games bronze medalists for Bahrain
Medalists at the 1986 Asian Games
Medalists at the 1982 Asian Games